Sewnet Bishaw is an Ethiopian football manager.

He achieved regional success with the Ethiopia national football team in 2005 when he won the CECAFA Cup during his first spell as manager.

In October 2011 Sewnet was re-appointed to the position after the resignation of Belgian coach, Tom Saintfiet. A year later, he helped Ethiopia qualify for their tenth Africa Cup of Nations tournament since 1982. He was sacked in August 2014, following poor results in 2014 World Cup qualifiers final game as Ethiopia suffered a heartbreaking loss to Nigeria by aggregate on its attempt to reach the 2014 FIFA World Cup.

References

Living people
1952 births
Ethiopian football managers
Ethiopia national football team managers
2013 Africa Cup of Nations managers
Sportspeople from Tigray Region